Gas Sales Bluenergy Piacenza is an Italian professional men's volleyball club based in the city of Piacenza, northern Italy. Dedicated businessmen and citizens decided to establish a new volleyball club to embrace the rich volleyball culture in Piacenza with the city's historic club, Volley Piacenza going bankrupt. That's why Gas Sales Bluenergy Piacenza was created. It currently plays in the Superlega, the highest level league of Italian volleyball.

It first debut to play in Serie A2 for Season 2018/19. After a successful season 2018/19 which they won the title of Serie A2, the team was promoted to Superlega.

Achievements
 Italian Championship Serie A2
  (×1) 2018–19
 Italian Cup Serie A2
  (×1) 2018–19
 Italian Cup SuperLega
  (×1) 2022–23

Team
Team roster – season 2022/2023

Notable players
  2021–2022 Maxwell Holt 
 2020–2022  Oleg Antonov
 2020–2022  Aaron Russell
 2021–2022  Tonček Štern
 2021–2022  Thibault Rossard

References

External links
 Official website 
 Team profile at Volleybox.net

Italian volleyball clubs
Sport in Piacenza
Volleyball clubs established in 2018
2018 establishments in Italy